René Petersen is a Danish retired footballer.

Career
Petersen started his senior career in Denmark. In 1996, he signed for Sint-Truidense V.V. in the Belgian Pro League, where he made over forty appearances and scored two league goals. After that, he played for English club Kidderminster Harriers and Danish club Hvidovre IF before retiring.

References

External links 
 René Petersen på vej hjem 
 Petersen calls it a day 
 Fodbold: Verdens bedste job med komplikationer 
 Anders Nielsen: «Misschien ben ik te braaf»

Danish men's footballers
Danish expatriate men's footballers
Association football midfielders
Living people
Expatriate footballers in Belgium
Kidderminster Harriers F.C. players
Hvidovre IF players
Sint-Truidense V.V. players
Expatriate footballers in England
Year of birth missing (living people)